Cleveland Mine was a mining settlement in Marquette County, Michigan located a mile west of Ishpeming.  It was established in 1866.

Sources

Populated places established in 1866
1866 establishments in Michigan
Marquette County, Michigan